National Tertiary Route 408, or just Route 408 (or ) is a National Road Route of Costa Rica, located in the Cartago province.

Description
In Cartago province the route covers Paraíso canton (Orosi district), Jiménez canton (Pejibaye district).

History
Landslides are common in this route.

References

Highways in Costa Rica